Karunakaran is an Indian poet, novelist, short story writer and essayist who writes in Malayalam. Known for an original style of writing, he has published a number of novels, short story anthologies, poetry anthologies, studies and essays. He was born in Pattambi, a town in Palakkad district of the south Indian state of Kerala. His oeuvre comprises novels such as Yuvaavaayirunna Onpathu Varsham and short story anthologies like Paayakkappal and he is a recipient of the 2019 O. V. Vijayan Sahitya Puraskaram. He lives in Kuwait.

Selected bibliography

Novels

Novellas

Short story anthologies

Poetry anthologies

Essays

See also 

 S. Hareesh
 N. Prabhakaran

References

Further reading

External links 
 
 
 
 
 
 

Living people
Writers from Kerala
People from Palakkad district
Indian male short story writers
Malayalam-language writers
Malayalam short story writers
Malayalam novelists
Indian male novelists
Indian male essayists
Indian male poets
Malayalam poets
Date of birth missing (living people)
Year of birth missing (living people)